Highway 357 is a highway in the Canadian province of Saskatchewan. It runs from Highway 8 to Highway 5 and Highway 369 near Togo.

References

357